Artist's Sketch of Pharaoh Spearing a Lion is an ostracon drawing from the Twentieth Dynasty of Egypt (ca. 1186–1070 B.C., part of the Ramesside period). It is in the collection of the Metropolitan Museum of Art.

Early history and creation
This is a piece of limestone sketched with ink. It was a trial sketch, though the final has not been found in any tombs nor does the figure conform to new kingdom proportions, that was discarded in the Valley of the Kings. It was discovered at the Tomb of Tutankhamun, near the entrance, during excavations in 1920.

Description and interpretation
The work depicts a Ramesside pharaoh spearing a lion. The lion symbolizes the enemies of Egypt. The back of the  work has a section of hieratic text, which reads: "The slaughter of every foreign land, the Pharaoh—may he live, prosper, and be healthy." Hieratic text is a term for cursive writing, which had been around and evolving since as early as the 2nd dynasty.

References

Drawings of the Metropolitan Museum of Art
Ostracon
Art of ancient Egypt